Sir John Kenneth McAlpine  (21 July 1906 – 11 January 1984) was a New Zealand politician of the National Party. He was the Member of Parliament for Selwyn from 1946 to 1966, when he retired.

Biography

McAlpine was born in Christchurch in 1906, the son of a sheepfarmer – Walter Kenneth McAlpine. He received his education at Christ's College in Christchurch. After school, he worked at his father's high-country station at Craigieburn, New Zealand in the Southern Alps east of Arthur's Pass. He became the manager of that station in 1929 and later lived at Spye, a locality in North Canterbury near Omihi, where his father had farmed. McAlpine married Lesley Hay in 1935; she was a descendant of Ebenezer Hay of Pigeon Bay who was the earliest white settler in Canterbury.

McAlpine Sr was chairman of the Lyttelton Harbour Board when he died in July 1937. Another member of the harbour board, James Leslie, died in September 1937. McAlpine Jr was one of two government-appointees to fill those vacancies and he attended his first meeting on 1 November 1937. On 2 June 1943, McAlpine Jr was voted chairman of the harbour board. He served two one-year terms and was succeeded by his deputy, Bill MacGibbon, on 6 June 1945.
 
He was Minister of Railways in the First National Government from 1954 to 1957. In the Second National Government from 1960 to 1966 he was Minister of Railways and Minister of Transport. In the 1970 Queen's Birthday Honours, he was appointed a Companion of the Order of St Michael and St George, for services to politics, and in the 1977 New Year Honours he was promoted to Knight Commander of the Order of St Michael and St George, for public services, especially as chairman of the New Zealand Ports Authority since 1969.

References

|-

|- 

|-

1906 births
1984 deaths
New Zealand National Party MPs
Members of the Cabinet of New Zealand
New Zealand Knights Commander of the Order of St Michael and St George
New Zealand people of Scottish descent
Members of the New Zealand House of Representatives
New Zealand MPs for South Island electorates
20th-century New Zealand politicians
New Zealand politicians awarded knighthoods
People educated at Christ's College, Christchurch
Lyttelton Harbour Board members
Chancellors of Lincoln University (New Zealand)